So Much Tenderness is a 2022 Canadian drama film, written, directed, produced, and edited by Lina Rodriguez. The film stars Noëlle Schönwald as Aurora, a lawyer from Colombia who emigrated to Canada as a refugee after her husband was murdered in mysterious circumstances, but whose efforts to comfortably settle into her new life are threatened when her cousin Edgar (Francisco Zaldua), who may have been involved in the murder, resurfaces.

The film's cast also includes Natalia Aranguren, Deragh Campbell, Augusto Bitter, Andreana Callegarini-Gradzik, Charlotte Creaghan, Brad Deane, Sebastian Kowollik, Lee Lawson, Kazik Radwanski, Alejandra Adarve, John Goodwin, Robin Guillen, Lina Gómez, Douglas Hann and Alexander Macdonald.

The film was shot in 2021 in Toronto, Hamilton and Bowmanville, Ontario.

The film premiered in the Contemporary World Cinema program at the 2022 Toronto International Film Festival.

References

External links 
 

2022 films
2022 drama films
Canadian drama films
Films shot in Toronto
Films shot in Hamilton, Ontario
English-language Canadian films
Spanish-language Canadian films
2020s Canadian films